The Brunswig Drug Company is an historic structure located at 383 5th Avenue in San Diego's Gaslamp Quarter, in the U.S. state of California. It was built in 1900.

See also
 List of Gaslamp Quarter historic buildings

External links

 

1900 establishments in California
Buildings and structures completed in 1900
Buildings and structures in San Diego
Gaslamp Quarter, San Diego